The Vorona is a left tributary of the river Siret in Romania. It flows into the Siret in Joldești.

References

Rivers of Romania
Rivers of Botoșani County